The Brno is a velodrome in Brno, Czech Republic. It is a 400 m outdoor covered concrete velodrome with an underpass and lights. The velodrome hosted the 1969 UCI Track Cycling World Championships and 1981 UCI Track Cycling World Championships. The velodrome still has the 1969 look and serves to bicycles club TJ Favorit Brno and it is a site for hosting various concerts and performances. As of 2015 there are still international cycle races taking place.

References

External links
 profile at waymarking.com

Velodromes in the Czech Republic
Sports venues in the Czech Republic
Cycle racing in the Czech Republic